The Chicago Opera House was a theater complex in Chicago, Illinois, designed by the architectural firm of Cobb and Frost. The Chicago Opera House building took the cue provided by the Metropolitan Opera of New York as a mixed-used building: it housed both a theater and unrelated offices, used to subsidize the cost of the theater building. The theater itself was located in the middle of the complex and office structures flanked each side. The entire complex was known as the "Chicago Opera House Block," and was located at the Southwest corner of West Washington Avenue and North Clark Street.

The Chicago Opera House was opened to the public on August 18, 1885. The first performance in the new theater was of Hamlet starring  Thomas W. Keene. From 1887 to 1890, the Chicago Opera House served as the official observation location for recording the climate of the city of Chicago by the National Weather Service.

The theater suffered a fire in December 1888, which mainly damaged portions of the roof. However, the roof was repaired, and most of the exterior of the building remained undamaged. During its existence, the Chicago Opera House was the site of the premiere of several successful musicals such as Sinbad and The Arabian Nights.

The last performance at the building was the stage play The Escape by Paul Armstrong (later made into a film, now lost, by D.W. Griffith in 1914). Demolition on The Chicago Opera House began May 5, 1913. The site is currently occupied by the Burnham Center (formerly known as the Conway Building), completed in 1915.

Construction
The idea for the Chicago Opera House came from Scottish-born newspaperman and financier David Henderson. Henderson "planned the scheme and the stock – 550,000 – was subscribed in six weeks. Thus Chicago had the first fireproof, steel constructed, electric lighted theatre in the country." The construction of the Chicago Opera House was one of the earliest examples of general contracting, run by George A. Fuller.

References

1885 establishments in Illinois
1912 disestablishments in Illinois
Buildings and structures demolished in 1913
Demolished buildings and structures in Chicago
Demolished theatres in Illinois
Demolished music venues in the United States
Music venues completed in 1885
Music venues in Chicago
Opera houses in Illinois
Theatres in Chicago
Theatres completed in 1885
Former theatres in the United States